The Macadam Cup is a varsity match played between the sports teams of King's College London proper (KCL) and Guy's, King's and St. Thomas' School of Medicine (GKT). The championship is named in honour of Sir Ivison Macadam, an alumnus of King's. Macadam also gave his name to a building at the King's Strand Campus, the location of the students' union (King's College London Students' Union).

History

The cup was first instituted in 2004 after an election pledge by the incoming President of the Students' Union, Michael Champion. The motivation behind the competition was not entirely focused on sports; Champion enjoyed large backing from the Health schools, and in a time where the political will of the college was to rebrand Guy's, King's and St. Thomas' (GKT) to KCLMS, Champion saw the event as an opportunity to enshrine GKT identity through the vehicle of a sporting event. The ulterior motive of the Macadam Cup was designed to make it increasingly difficult for Champion's successors to merge the GKT sports teams with the KCL ones.

As Champion's year in office progressed it looked less likely that the Competition would materialise; funds for extraordinary ventures like this were not available and with the exception of the vice-president (Student Activities), Ben Philip, Champion did not enjoy the support from his fellow executive board members.

When few thought the competition would go ahead, Champion found a dusty old St. Thomas' Rowing Club champagne bowl, took it to Asprey and Garrard on New Bond Street and got it restored to its former glory for £1,000. He had inscribed on the bowl: Vicant Optimi or "The best shall win". The shortfall in funds was provided by the King's College London Alumni Association, and so, in its first year, the Cup was called "The Alumni Macadam Cup".

Sports
Since its conception, the Macadam Cup has grown in the number of sports contested. At present these include: Swimming gala, Water polo, Badminton, Squash, Hockey (men and women), Mixed fencing, Mixed tennis, Ultimate frisbee, Rugby (men and women), Netball, Lacrosse, Football (men and women) and Cricket.

Sports and presentations are mainly held at Berrylands and occasionally shared with Honor Oak Park Sports Ground with the day ending a Results night in KCLSU's Tutu's night club.

Results

From its inauguration in 2004 to 2010, King's College London had yet to win the Macadam Cup, leading to chants of "You'll never win Macadam". In 2011, 2014 and 2016, and 2018 KCL won the Macadam Cup.

In the event of a tie, the Macadam Cup is ordinarily determined by a 'Tug of War'. In 2017, the winner of the cup was decided on football penalties, carried out by members of 5 different sports, which GKT won 4–1.

External links
King's College London
King's College London Students' Union

References

King's College London
Student sport rivalries in the United Kingdom
Student sport in London